The 1940 college football season was the 72nd season of intercollegiate football in the United States.  Competition included schools from the Big Ten Conference, the Pacific Coast Conference (PCC), the Southeastern Conference (SEC), the Big Six Conference, the Southern Conference, the Southwestern Conference, and numerous smaller conferences and independent programs.

The teams ranked highest in the final Associated Press poll in December 1940 were:
 1940 Minnesota Golden Gophers football team - Led by head coach Bernie Bierman, the Golden Gophers compiled an 8–0 record, won the Big Ten championship, and outscored opponents by a total of 154 to 71. Halfback George Franck was a consensus All-American and placed third in the Heisman Trophy voting. Quarterback Bob Paffrath was selected as the team's most valuable player. Minnesota was selected as national champions by the Associated Press (AP) poll.
 1940 Stanford Indians football team - Led by head coach Clark Shaughnessy, the Indians compiled a perfect 10–0 record, including a victory over No. 7 Nebraska in the 1941 Rose Bowl. The final AP poll was conducted before the Rose Bowl with Stanford receiving 44 first place votes, narrowly trailing Minnesota's 65 votes. Stanford was selected as national champions by the Poling System and Williamson System and retroactively by the Helms Athletic Foundation and Billingsley Report.
 1940 Michigan Wolverines football team - Led by head coach Fritz Crisler, the Wolverines compiled a 7–1 record with its only loss coming against national champion Minnesota by a 7–6 score. Halfback Tom Harmon won the Heisman Trophy and the Maxwell Award and shared the backfield with quarterback Forest Evashevski and fullback Bob Westfall.
 1940 Tennessee Volunteers football team - Led by head coach Robert Neyland, the Volunteers compiled a 10–0 record in the regular season but lost to Boston College in the 1941 Sugar Bowl. Tennessee was selected as national champions by the Dunkel System. Guard Bob Suffridge was a unanimous pick on the 1940 All-America team.
 1940 Boston College Eagles football team - In their final season under head coach Frank Leahy, the Eagles compiled a perfect 11–0, including a 19–13 victory over No. 4 Tennessee in the Sugar Bowl. End Gene Goodreault was a consensus pick on the All-America team.
 1940 Texas A&M Aggies football team - The Aggies compiled a 9–1 record and defeated Fordham in the 1941 Cotton Bowl Classic. Fullback John Kimbrough was a unanimous pick on the 1940 All-America team.

The year's statistical leaders included Al Ghesquiere of Detroit with 958 rushing yards, Johnny Knolla of Creighton with 1,420 yards of total offense, Johnny Supulski of Manhattan with 1,190 passing yards, Hank Stanton of Arizona with 820 receiving yards, and Tom Harmon with 117 points scored.

Conference and program changes

Conference changes
One conference began play during 1940:
New Mexico Intercollegiate Conference – an NCAA College Division and NAIA conference active through the 1962 season; later known as the Frontier Conference
One conference played its final season in 1940:
Alamo Conference – conference active since the 1936 season

Membership changes

September
September 28 Defending champion Texas A&M beat Texas A&I (later the university's Kingsville campus), 26–0.  Tennessee beat Mercer 49–0.  USC and Washington State played to a 14–14 tie.  Tulane lost to Boston College 27–7.  Michigan won at California 41–0. Minnesota defeated Washington 19–14 in Minneapolis.

October
October 5 In San Antonio, Texas A&M beat Tulsa 41–6. Tennessee beat Duke 13–0.  Cornell beat Colgate 34–0. Northwestern won at Syracuse, 40–0.  Minnesota beat Nebraska 13–7. Michigan beat Michigan State 21–14.

October 12 Cornell won at Army 45–0.
In Los Angeles, Texas A&M beat UCLA 7–0.  Tennessee beat Chattanooga 53–0.  Northwestern beat Ohio State 6–3.  Michigan won at Harvard 26–0. The top five in the year's first AP Poll were No. 1 Cornell, No. 2 Texas A&M, No. 3 Michigan, No. 4 Northwestern, and No. 5 Tennessee.

October 19 No. 1 Cornell beat Syracuse 33–6.  No. 2 Texas A&M beat TCU 21–7.  No. 3 Michigan beat Illinois 28–0. In Birmingham, No. 5 Tennessee beat Alabama, 27–12. No. 6 Notre Dame beat Carnegie Tech 61–0. The resulting AP Poll was No. 1 Cornell, No. 2 Notre Dame, No. 3 Michigan, No. 4 Texas A&M, and No. 5 Tennessee. Despite a 27–7 win at Wisconsin, Northwestern fell from 4th to 7th; previous No. 7 Minnesota moved up one spot with a 13-7 win over No. 15 Ohio State in Columbus.

October 26 No. 1 Cornell beat Ohio State 21–7.  No. 2 Notre Dame won at Illinois 26–0.  No. 3 Michigan  beat Pennsylvania 14–0.  No. 4 Texas A&M won at Baylor 14–7.  No. 5 Tennessee beat Florida 14–0.  No. 6 Minnesota beat Iowa 34–6. Cornell, Notre Dame, and Michigan remained as the top three, followed by Minnesota and Texas A&M.

November
November 2 No. 1 Cornell beat Columbia 27–0. No. 2 Notre Dame beat Army 7–0 at Yankee Stadium. No. 3 Michigan was idle.  No. 4 Minnesota narrowly won at No. 8 Northwestern, 13–12. No. 5 Texas A&M beat Arkansas 17–0.  No. 7 Tennessee beat LSU 28–0. The next AP Poll ranked Cornell, Minnesota, Michigan, Texas A&M, and Tennessee as the top five. Notre Dame fell from No. 2 to No. 7 after their close win over a weak Army team (the Cadets would finish 1-7-1).

November 9 No. 1 Cornell beat Yale 21–0, but dropped to second in the next poll. No. 2 Minnesota and No. 3 Michigan, both unbeaten (5–0–0), met in Minneapolis, with the Gophers winning by one point, 7–6. No. 4 Texas A&M won at No. 14 SMU 19–7. No. 5 Tennessee won at Rhodes College 41–0.  No. 6 Stanford beat No. 11 Washington 20–10 to advance its record to 7–0–0. The resulting AP Poll was No. 1 Minnesota, No. 2 Cornell, No. 3 Texas A&M, No. 4 Stanford, and No. 5 Tennessee.

November 16 No. 1 Minnesota beat Purdue 33–6.  No. 2 Cornell lost at Dartmouth 3–0 in the famous "Fifth Down" game. No. 3 Texas A&M beat Rice 25–0.  No. 4 Stanford beat No. 19 Oregon State 28–14. No. 8 Boston College beat No. 9 Georgetown 19–18 to extend its record to 8–0–0. The next AP Poll featured No. 1 Minnesota, No. 2 Texas A&M, No. 3 Stanford, No. 4 Boston College, and No. 5 Cornell. Previous No. 5 Tennessee fell to No. 6 despite an 8-0-0 record and a 41–14 win over Virginia.

November 23 No. 1 Minnesota closed its season with a 22–13 win at Wisconsin. No. 2 Texas A&M and No. 3 Stanford were idle.  No. 4 Boston College beat Auburn 33–7. No. 5 Cornell lost 22-20 to Pennsylvania. No. 7 Michigan won at Ohio State to close its season at 7–1–0 and moved into fifth place behind Minnesota, Texas A&M, Stanford, and Boston College.

On Thanksgiving Day No. 2 Texas A&M lost at Texas 7–0. On November 30 No. 3 Stanford closed its season with a 13–7 win at California, No. 4 Boston College defeated Holy Cross 7–0, and No. 6 Tennessee beat Vanderbilt 20–0. The top five of the final AP Poll were No. 1 Minnesota, No. 2 Stanford, No. 3 Michigan, No. 4 Tennessee, and No. 5 Boston College.

Conference standings

Major conference standings

Independents

Minor conferences

Minor conference standings

Rankings

Heisman Trophy voting
The Heisman Trophy is given to the year's most outstanding player

Bowl games

See also
 1940 College Football All-America Team

References